Yen Chia-kan (23 October 1905 – 24 December 1993), also known as C. K. Yen, was a Kuomintang politician. He succeeded Chiang Kai-shek as President of the Republic of China on 5 April 1975, being sworn in on 6 April 1975, and served out the remainder of Chiang's term until 20 May 1978.

Early life
He was born in Mudu, Wu County, Jiangsu province in 1905. He came of a prestigious Suzhou family, the Yan (Yen) Family of Dongshan. He graduated from Saint John's University in Shanghai with a degree in chemistry in 1926.

Political career
In 1931, Yen began serving as a manager of the Shanghai railway administration. Yen started to work as director of the finance department of Fujian Provincial Government in 1938. During his term, he initiated a policy of land tax payment for farmers with their agricultural produce. This policy was then adopted nationwide across China and contributed significantly for the nation food supply during World War II.

When he arrived in Taiwan in October 1945, Yen was appointed transportation director for the Taiwan Provincial Government. He was later named provincial finance director. From the provincial government, Yen was subsequently elevated to chairman of the Bank of Taiwan. In this position, Yen became known as "father of the New Taiwan dollar," as the currency was introduced in June 1949, during his tenure at the bank. Yen then served as Minister of Economic Affairs, minister of finance, and Governor of Taiwan Province. He became premier on 16 December 1963.

In 1966 the National Assembly elected Yen as Vice President and re-elected him in 1972. As vice president, Yen served as the most senior government official of the Republic of China to travel aboard, as Chiang Kai-shek had stated that he would not leave Taiwan until the Chinese Civil War was resolved by unification of the Republic of China. In May 1967, Yen toured the United States, during which he met US President Lyndon B. Johnson. On the afternoon of January 5, 1973, Yen visited Washington, D.C. and met with US President Richard Nixon. In December 1974, Yen traveled throughout Central America and the Caribbean, during which he attended the inauguration of Anastasio Somoza Debayle, who was starting his second stint as President of Nicaragua.

Yen became the second President following the death of Chiang Kai-shek. During his presidency, the Kuomintang worked on the "Chang'an Project", which was to design, manufacture, and test defensive missiles. On 9 July 1977, he visited Saudi Arabia, becoming the first Republic of China president to visit another country after the government moved to Taiwan. On 20 May 1978, Yen resigned and was succeeded by Chiang's son, KMT Chairman and Premier Chiang Ching-kuo. 

Yen served as chairman of the Council on Chinese Cultural Renaissance during his presidency. Though he wished to resign after leaving the presidency, the organization's bylaws were amended so that Yen could retain the post. He was also chairman of the board of the National Palace Museum until 1991.

Death
Yen had been bedridden since a brain hemorrhage in 1986. He suffered a second brain hemorrhage in 1992 and died at the Taipei Veterans General Hospital on 24 December 1993 the age of 88. He was buried at the Wuchih Mountain Military Cemetery in New Taipei City.

See also

 History of the Republic of China
 Politics of the Republic of China

References

1905 births
1993 deaths
Politicians from Suzhou
Premiers of the Republic of China on Taiwan
Presidents of the Republic of China on Taiwan
Vice presidents of the Republic of China on Taiwan
Taiwanese Ministers of Finance
Republic of China politicians from Jiangsu
Taiwanese Ministers of Economic Affairs
Taiwanese Ministers of the Veterans Affairs Council
Chairpersons of the Taiwan Provincial Government
St. John's University, Shanghai alumni
Chinese Civil War refugees
Taiwanese people from Jiangsu